Eston United Football Club were an English association football club founded in 1905. Initially named Normanby United, their name was quickly changed to Eston United soon after formation. They participated in the Northern League from 1910–1927, winning the league on two occasions. Eston were also twice losing finalists in the FA Amateur Cup, losing 6–0 to Clapton in the 1908–09 season and in the 1911–12 season they lost 1–0 to Stockton in a replay after the first tie ended in a 1–1 draw.

Achievements
FA Amateur Cup
Runners-up: 1908–09, 1911–12
Northern League
Champions: 1910–11, 1922–23

References

1905 establishments in England
1927 disestablishments in England
Association football clubs established in 1905
Defunct football clubs in England
Association football clubs disestablished in 1927
Defunct football clubs in North Yorkshire